The Eurovision Young Musicians, often shortened to EYM, or Young Musicians, is a biennial classical music competition for European musicians that are aged between 12 and 21. It is organised by the European Broadcasting Union (EBU) and broadcast on television throughout Europe, with some countries holding national selections to choose their representatives for the contest.

The first edition of the Eurovision Young Musicians took place in Manchester, United Kingdom on 11 May 1982 and 6 countries took part. The twentieth and most recent edition of this competition took place in Montpellier, France on 23 July 2022 and was won by Daniel Matejča, who played the violin for the Czech Republic.

Background and history 

The idea to organise a competition for young musicians was first examined by the EBU Expert Group for TV music programmes in March 1980 during a meeting chaired by BBC's Humphrey Burton in Geneva, Switzerland.

The Eurovision Young Musicians, inspired by the success of the BBC Young Musician of the Year, is a biennial competition organised by the European Broadcasting Union (EBU) for European musicians that are 18 years old or younger. The BBC competition was established in 1978 by Burton, Walter Todds and Roy Tipping, former members of the BBC Television Music Department. Michael Hext, a trombonist, was the inaugural winner that year.

As a result of the success of the competition, the Eurovision Young Musicians competition was initiated in 1982. 
The first edition of the Eurovision Young Musicians took place in Manchester, United Kingdom on 11 May 1982 and six countries took part. Some participating countries held national heats in order to select their representatives for the contest. Germany's Markus Pawlik won the contest, with France and Switzerland placing second and third respectively. It was also notable that Germany won the Eurovision Song Contest 1982 just a few weeks earlier. Three years later, the EBU decided to create a dance version based on this competition, which became Eurovision Young Dancers. That event took place in the odd years while Eurovision Young Musicians takes place in the even years.

In 1986, due to the increasing number of participating countries, a semi-final round was introduced at the competition, from which, according to the results of the jury's voting, five to eight of the participating countries progressed to the televised final. Following this, the competition did not undergo any major changes for a number of years. In 2006, the competition was one of the central events of the Year of Mozart and to celebrate the 250th anniversary of the birth of Wolfgang Amadeus Mozart, the pieces performed by the finalists were restricted to Mozart or pieces from his contemporaries.

Between 2006 and 2012, the competition was the opening event of one of the largest festivals in Europe, Vienna Festival and was held on an open-air stage for the first time. The 2018 contest was hosted by the BBC in partnership and as a highlight of the annual Edinburgh International Festival. The 2020 edition of the contest was scheduled to take place in Zagreb, Croatia on 21 June to coincide with World Music Day celebrations. The contest would have taken place on an open-air stage in King Tomislav Square. However, on 18 March 2020, it was announced that the event had been postponed indefinitely as a result of the COVID-19 pandemic in Europe, The future of the contest is uncertain until 3 February 2022 when the Norwegian broadcaster NRK confirmed, in an online article regarding its national selection Virtuos, that the upcoming edition would instead now be held in Montpellier, France in July.

Format 

Each country is represented by one young talented musician that performs a piece of classical music of his or her choice accompanied by the local orchestra of the host broadcaster and a jury, composed of international experts, decides the top 3 participants. From 1986 to 2012 and again in 2018, a semi-final round took place a few days before the Contest, and the jury decided as well which countries qualified for the final.

A preliminary round took place in 2014, with the jury scoring each musician and performance, however all participating countries automatically qualified for the final. The semi final elimination stage of the contest was expected to return in 2016. However the semi-finals were later removed due to the low number of participating countries that year.

In 1992 and 1994, a compilation CD was released by the host broadcaster and supported by an independent record label.

Participation 

Eligible participants include primarily Active Members (as opposed to Associate Members) of the EBU. Active members are those who are located in states that fall within the European Broadcasting Area, or are member states of the Council of Europe.

The European Broadcasting Area is defined by the International Telecommunication Union:

The "European Broadcasting Area" is bounded on the west by the western boundary of Region 1, on the east by the meridian 40° East of Greenwich and on the south by the parallel 30° North so as to include the northern part of Saudi Arabia and that part of those countries bordering the Mediterranean within these limits. In addition, Armenia, Azerbaijan, Georgia and those parts of the territories of Iraq, Jordan, Syrian Arab Republic, Turkey and Ukraine lying outside the above limits are included in the European Broadcasting Area.

The western boundary of Region 1 is defined by a line running from the North Pole along meridian 10° West of Greenwich to its intersection with parallel 72° North; thence by great circle arc to the intersection of meridian 50° West and parallel 40° North; thence by great circle arc to the intersection of meridian 20° West and parallel 10° South; thence along meridian 20° West to the South Pole.

Active members include broadcasting organisations whose transmissions are made available to at least 98% of households in their own country which are equipped to receive such transmissions. If an EBU Active Member wishes to participate, they must fulfil conditions as laid down by the rules of the contest (of which a separate copy is drafted annually).

Eligibility to participate is not determined by geographic inclusion within the continent of Europe, despite the "Euro" in "Eurovision" – nor does it have any relation to the European Union. Listed below are all the countries that have taken part in the competition or are eligible to take part but have yet to do so.

Forty-two countries have participated in the Eurovision Young Musicians since it started in 1982. Of these, eleven have won the contest. The contest, organised by the European Broadcasting Union (EBU), is held biennially between members of the Union.

As of 2022, the Eurovision Young Musicians has had the most "one-and-done" participants of any continuous Eurovision event that has run for more than two years. No fewer than ten countries have made only one appearance at the event prior to withdrawing (Albania, Armenia, Bosnia and Herzegovina, Bulgaria, Georgia, Lithuania, Moldova, North Macedonia, Serbia and Montenegro, and the latter's direct successor Serbia). Comparatively, there have been eight for Eurovision Young Dancers, two (Serbia and Montenegro and Switzerland) for the Junior Eurovision Song Contest, and one (Morocco) for the flagship Eurovision Song Contest. It also has the most cases of countries withdrawing after winning, which has happened on three occasions (the Netherlands withdrawing from the 1992 contest, Germany withdrawing from the 1998 contest, and Russia withdrawing from the planned 2020 contest), compared to one instance each at Eurovision Young Dancers (Ukraine withdrawing from the 2005 edition) and the Eurovision Song Contest (Israel withdrawing from the 1980 edition). Should they remain in the contest for 2022, Malta will be the only remaining country to have not missed a single contest since their debut, while several other countries with multiple appearances have only missed one since their debut (those being Austria, Norway, Poland, San Marino, and Slovenia).

It was the first EBU event to include a large number of former Soviet states and Warsaw Pact member states, many of whom debuted in the Young Musicians prior to their Eurovision Song Contest debut (including the Czech Republic, Hungary, Latvia, North Macedonia, and Poland).

Hosting
Most of the expense of the contest is covered by commercial sponsors and contributions from the other participating nations. The contest is considered to be a unique opportunity for promoting the host country as a tourist destination. The table below shows a list of cities and venues that have hosted the Eurovision Young Musicians, one or more times. Future venues are shown in italics. With 6 contests, Austria and its capital, Vienna have hosted the most contests. It has also shared two venues with the Eurovision Song Contest (Edinburgh's Usher Hall, which hosted both the 1972 song contest and the 2018 Young Musicians; and Bergen's Grieg Hall, which hosted both the 1986 song contest and the 2000 Young Musicians).

Instruments and their first appearance
List contains only instruments played in the televised finals (preliminary rounds or semi finals are not included).

Winners 
As of 2022, there have been twenty editions of the Eurovision Young Musicians competition, a biennial musicians contest organised by member countries of the European Broadcasting Union, with each contest having one winner. Austria is the only country to have ever scored a home victory, with violinist Lidia Baich winning the 1998 contest in Vienna. Austria is also one of only two countries to have hosted after winning the previous contest (as was the case in 1988 and 2006), alongside Poland, who hosted the 1994 contest after winning the 1992 edition. It is the only Eurovision event to date to have multiple instances of the same country winning that also won that year's Eurovision Song Contest (Germany won both events in 1982 and Austria won both in 2014), and the only instance of one country hosting multiple major Eurovision events in the same year (the United Kingdom, who hosted both the 1982 Song Contest and Young Musicians, thereby also making it the sole occasion where the same country not only won multiple Eurovision events in the same year, but did both in the same host country).

Winners by year

By country
The table below shows the top-three placings from each contest, along with the years that a country won the contest.

By instrument
As of 2022, twenty-four instruments have appeared at least once in the televised finals (preliminary rounds or semi finals are not included). The following seven have been played by a winner at least once.

Presenters, conductors and orchestras

See also 

 BBC Young Musician
 Eurovision Choir of the Year
 Eurovision Dance Contest
 Eurovision Magic Circus Show
 Eurovision Song Contest
 Eurovision Young Dancers
 Junior Eurovision Song Contest

Notes and references

Notes

References

External links 

 
 Eurovision Young Musicians  – European Broadcasting Union

 
Classical music television series
Early career awards
Youth music competitions
Young Musicians
European music
Awards established in 1982
1982 establishments in Europe